Welcome to Demon School! Iruma-kun is an anime series adapted from the manga series, written by Osamu Nishi. The series is directed by Makoto Moriwaki at Bandai Namco Pictures, with Kazuyuki Fudeyasu handling series composition, and Akimitsu Honma composing the music. The 23-episode anime series aired from October 5, 2019, to March 7, 2020, on NHK Educational TV. The opening theme is "Magical Babyrinth" performed by Da Pump, while the ending theme is  performed by Yu Serizawa. Crunchyroll is streaming the series. A second season was announced and aired from April 17 to September 11, 2021. The opening theme for the second season is "No! No! Satisfaction!" by Da Pump, while the ending theme is "Kokoro Show Time" by Amatsuki.  A third season was announced and aired from October 8, 2022 to March 4, 2023.  The opening theme is  performed by Fantastics from Exile Tribe, while the ending theme is  performed by Wednesday Campanella.



Series overview

Episode list

Season 1 (2019–20)

Season 2 (2021)

Season 3 (2022–23)

Notes

References

Welcome to Demon School! Iruma-kun